Denis Perger (born 10 June 1993) is a Slovenian professional footballer who plays as a defender for SV Wildon.

Club career 
Perger began his career with the youth setup of NK Drava Ptuj, his hometown club.  In January 2010, Perger was signed to a youth contract by Parma of Italy's Serie A but was released only six months later.   Perger then re-signed for Ptuj before signing for FC Koper of the Slovenian PrvaLiga, the top level of football in the country. In total, Perger appeared in three league matches with Ptuj and 24 league matches for Koper.

In July during the Summer 2013 transfer window, Perger was signed by SC Freiburg of Germany's Bundesliga until 30 June 2014 and immediately loaned to SV Wehen Wiesbaden of the 3. Liga for the 2013–14 3. Liga season so that Perger could get playing time at a high level. At Wiesbaden, Perger was assigned the number 13 and it was expected that he would fill the roster spots left empty by injuries to defenders Daniel Döringer and Maximilian Ahlschwede.

Perger returned to SC Freiburg from his loan in May 2014 after making 13 first team appearances for Wiesbaden.

International career 
Perger represented Slovenia at all youth levels from under-15 to under-21. He made his debut for the under-21 team on 6 February 2013 in a friendly against Portugal.

References

External links 
 NZS profile 
 National team stats 
 
 

1993 births
Living people
People from Ptuj
Slovenian footballers
Association football fullbacks
Slovenia youth international footballers
Slovenia under-21 international footballers
Slovenian PrvaLiga players
3. Liga players
NK Drava Ptuj players
FC Koper players
SC Freiburg players
SV Wehen Wiesbaden players
NK Drava Ptuj (2004) players
Lechia Gdańsk players
Slovenian expatriate footballers
Slovenian expatriate sportspeople in Italy
Expatriate footballers in Italy
Slovenian expatriate sportspeople in Germany
Expatriate footballers in Germany
Slovenian expatriate sportspeople in Poland
Expatriate footballers in Poland
Slovenian expatriate sportspeople in Austria
Expatriate footballers in Austria